The Martinsville Fish Dam is a Native American weir in the Smith River near Martinsville, Virginia.  The weir is a rough wall of piled rocks in a V shape with the point of the V downstream.  At an opening in that point a basket could be used to catch fish that were funneled to that point by the walls of the weir.

The dam was listed on the National Register of Historic Places in 1974.

See also
National Register of Historic Places listings in Henry County, Virginia

References

Dams on the National Register of Historic Places in Virginia
Henry County, Virginia
Dams in Virginia
Native American history of Virginia
National Register of Historic Places in Henry County, Virginia
Weirs